Pyrgos is a village east of the town of Limassol, Cyprus. The town has an exit on the A6 Paphos-Larnaca motorway.

References

Communities in Limassol District